Hoskyns is a surname. Notable people with the surname include:

Anthony Leigh Egerton Hoskyns-Abrahall (1903–1982), Anglican Bishop of Lancaster
Barney Hoskyns (born 1959), British music critic
Bennet Hoskyns, MP for Hereford 1645 and 1654
Bill Hoskyns (1931–2013),  British Olympic fencer
Chandos Wren-Hoskyns (1812–1876), English landowner
Sir Edwyn Hoskyns, 12th Baronet (1851–1925)
Sir Edwyn Hoskyns, 13th Baronet (1884–1937)
Sir John Hoskyns, 2nd Baronet (1634–1705), baronet and one of the founders of the Royal Society
John Hoskyns (policy advisor) (1927–2014), policy advisor to Margaret Thatcher (1979–1982)

See also
Hoskyns Group
Hoskyns Baronets
Hoskyn Islands, Australia
Hoskin, surname
Hoskins, surname

English-language surnames